Wang Jinliang (born 28 August 1993) is a Chinese footballer who plays for China League Two side Jiangsu Yancheng Dingli on loan from Changchun Yatai.

Club career
Wang Jinliang started his football career when he joined Chinese Super League side Changchun Yatai's youth academy. He was loaned to China League Two side Shaanxi Laochenggen from 2011 to 2013. Wang moved to Campeonato de Portugal side Mafra in September 2013. He was loaned to Vila F. Rosário for half season in January 2014. Wang made his debut for Mafra on 31 August 2014 in a 3–1 home victory against Leiria, coming on as a substitute for Luís Carlos in the 84th minute. He made nine appearances in the 2014–15 league season as Mafra won the titles of the league and promoted to the LigaPro. Wang was training with Cova da Piedade in the 2015–16 season but didn't register in the club.

Wang returned to Changchun Yatai in the summer of 2016. On 24 July 2016, he made his Super League debut in a 2–1 away defeat against Hebei China Fortune, coming on for Du Zhenyu in the second half. Wang was relegated to reserve team in the 2018 season. On 23 June 2018, he was loaned to China League Two side Sichuan Jiuniu for the rest of the season. He made his debut on the same day in a 1–1 away draw against Zhenjiang Huasa, coming on for Cao Yiyao in the 58th minute.

On 2 March 2019, Wang was loaned to League Two side Jiangsu Yancheng Dingli for the 2019 season.

Career statistics

Honours
Mafra
 Campeonato de Portugal: 2014–15

References

1993 births
Living people
People from Tieling
Chinese footballers
Footballers from Liaoning
C.D. Mafra players
Changchun Yatai F.C. players
Sichuan Jiuniu F.C. players
Chinese Super League players
Chinese expatriate footballers
Expatriate footballers in Portugal
Chinese expatriate sportspeople in Portugal
Association football midfielders